Sometime between 10 and 16 January 2023, a radioactive capsule containing caesium-137 was lost from a truck in Western Australia. The capsule was being transported  from Rio Tinto's Gudai-Darri iron ore mine near Newman to a depot in the Perth suburb of Malaga. The Department of Fire and Emergency Services announced to the public on 27 January that the capsule had gone missing, and that the capsule was potentially deadly and could cause burns and radiation sickness. It was discovered on the side of the road near Newman on 1 February.

The capsule 
The capsule contains 19 gigabecquerel of caesium-137 as a ceramic source. The amount of radiation emitted by the capsule could induce burns and radiation sickness and is potentially deadly to humans.

Timeline 
On 10 January 2023, the capsule was packed in order for repair works to be carried out in Perth.

Between 11 and 14 January, the capsule left Rio Tinto's Gudai-Darri mine for transport. The package containing the capsule arrived in Perth on 16 January and was unloaded and placed into secure storage. The package was unpacked for inspection on 25 January, with one of four mounting bolts and all screws on the gauge missing, and the capsule itself also missing. Authorities surmised that the bolt had worked loose because of vibrations during the  journey, and then the capsule had fallen through the bolt hole.

On the evening of 25 January, the Department of Fire and Emergency Services (DFES) was notified of the missing capsule by the Western Australia Police Force.

The Chief Health Officer of Western Australia, Andrew Robertson, held an emergency press conference, with DFES issuing an "urgent public health warning" on 27 January. Members of the public were warned to observe a safe distance of five metres if they found the capsule, and drivers who had recently used the Great Northern Highway were asked to check their vehicle tyres in case it was lodged in the tread.

A search was carried out after the capsule was reported missing, with more than 100 personnel involved. Agencies assisting the search included the Australian Radiation Protection and Nuclear Safety Agency, WA Police, DFES, and the Australian Nuclear Science and Technology Organisation.

The presence was noticed when the detection equipment picked up radiation emitted by the capsule. Authorities said it was unlikely it caused harm to anyone in the time it was lost.

Responses
Prime Minister Anthony Albanese has criticised the low penalty for losing radioactive materials in Western Australia. Under the Radiation Safety Regulations Act, the maximum penalty for failing to safely store, pack and transport radioactive materials is a $1,000 fine. The Government of Western Australia has stated it will review the penalties for mishandling radioactive materials, but any change will not be retroactive. Rio Tinto has offered to pay for the search costs.

The search and subsequent recovery of the capsule has been likened to finding a "needle in a haystack" by the media and authorities.

See also 

Goiânia accident
List of orphan source incidents

References

2020s in Western Australia
Caesium
January 2023 events in Australia
February 2023 events in Australia
Mining in Western Australia
Radiation accidents and incidents